Patrick Joseph Reynolds (25 November 1920 – 27 December 2003) was an Irish Fine Gael politician who served three terms in Dáil Éireann and five in Seanad Éireann, where he was Cathaoirleach (chairman) for four years.

Family and early life
Reynolds was born in Killellan, County Leitrim in 1920. His father Patrick Reynolds was elected as a Cumann na nGaedheal Teachta Dála (TD) for Leitrim–Sligo at the September 1927 general election, but was fatally shot during the 1932 general election campaign. The election in Leitrim–Sligo was postponed, and his mother Mary won the seat, serving the Dáil for 29 years.

He was educated locally, receiving only a primary school education before his father's death forced him to leave school and join the family business. He built the business successfully, transforming the hardware shop which he had inherited from into one of the largest builders' suppliers and hardware merchants in the north west.

With his wife Tess, he had two sons, Gerry and Peter, and two daughters, Ita and Regina. Gerry continued the family's political tradition, serving like his father as a Fine Gael TD and senator.

Political career
Reynolds was first elected to Leitrim County Council in 1943, and served as a councillor for more than 40 years, taking a particular interest in rural electrification and group water schemes. He was the longest-serving chairman of the council, holding the office for 12 years from 1967 to 1979.

He was first elected to the 17th Dáil at the 1961 general election, as a TD for the Roscommon constituency. He was re-elected at the 1965 general election, but at the 1969 general election he was defeated in the new Roscommon–Leitrim constituency. He was then elected to the 12th Seanad by the Administrative Panel.

The 1960s proved to be a fallow period for Fine Gael as the party was out of power for the entire decade, but at the 1973 general election a Fine Gael–Labour Party coalition government came to power and Reynolds was elected to the 20th Dáil for Roscommon–Leitrim. In 1976, he was appointed Parliamentary Secretary to the Minister for Education and to the Minister for the Public Service. In spite of this appointment, Reynolds lost his Dáil seat at the 1977 general election. Following this defeat, he secured election to the 14th Seanad on the Industrial and Commercial Panel, which re-elected him to the 15th Seanad in 1981, the 16th Seanad in 1982 and 17th Seanad in 1983.

He was elected on 23 February 1983 as Cathaoirleach of the 17th Seanad, succeeding Tras Honan. He held the office until he stepped down from the Seanad at the 1987 election.

Reynolds died on 27 December 2003, aged 83, and was buried in his home town of Ballinamore, County Leitrim. Tributes in the Seanad after his death described him as a traditionalist or conservative, but praised his warmth, fairness and integrity, and the Irish Independent described his hospitality as "legendary".

See also
Families in the Oireachtas

References

 

1920 births
2003 deaths
Fine Gael TDs
Cathaoirligh of Seanad Éireann
Hardware merchants
Members of the 17th Dáil
Members of the 18th Dáil
Members of the 12th Seanad
Members of the 20th Dáil
Members of the 14th Seanad
Members of the 15th Seanad
Members of the 16th Seanad
Members of the 17th Seanad
Local councillors in County Leitrim
Parliamentary Secretaries of the 20th Dáil
Fine Gael senators